KIBR (102.5 FM) is a radio station broadcasting a country format. Licensed to Sandpoint, Idaho, United States, the station is currently owned by Benefield Broadcasting, Inc.

History
The station was assigned the call letters KJDE by the FCC on 1988-08-24. On 1995-05-03, the station changed its call sign to KSPT and on 1998-08-17 to the current KIBR.

KIBR shares studios and offices with its sister stations at 327 Marion Avenue in Sandpoint.

Programming is also heard in Bonners Ferry, Idaho on 102.3 K272AR, operating with 34 watts of power.

References

External links

IBR
Country radio stations in the United States